The 2005–06 NBA season was the Atlanta Hawks' 57th season in the National Basketball Association, and 38th season in Atlanta. After finishing the previous season with the worst record, the Hawks selected Marvin Williams out of the University of North Carolina with the second overall pick in the 2005 NBA draft. During the offseason, the team acquired Joe Johnson from the Phoenix Suns, and signed free agent Zaza Pachulia. However, tragedy struck as center Jason Collier suffered a heart attack during the preseason and died suddenly on October 15. The Hawks would stumble out of the gate again losing their first nine games the same as the Toronto Raptors, on their way to an awful 2–16 start. Tony Delk was released to free agency after one game, and later signed with the Detroit Pistons. However, they would play better in December winning five of their next seven games, including a home win over the defending champion San Antonio Spurs, 94–84 on December 10. The Hawks played .500 basketball in February, which included a 99–98 home victory over the Pistons on February 7. The Hawks doubled their win total by finishing last place in the Southeast Division with a 26–56 record, tied with the second-year Charlotte Bobcats.

Johnson led the Hawks in scoring with 20.2 points per game, while Al Harrington averaged 18.6 points and 6.9 rebounds per game. Second-year forward Josh Smith provided the team with 11.3 points, 6.6 rebounds and 2.6 blocks per game, and Williams was selected to the NBA All-Rookie Second Team. Following the season, Harrington was traded back to his former team, the Indiana Pacers, then traded again this time to the Golden State Warriors along with Stephen Jackson, and two other players just two months later.

Offseason

Draft picks

Roster

Roster Notes
 Center Jason Collier died on October 15

Regular season

Season standings

z - clinched division title
y - clinched division title
x - clinched playoff spot

Record vs. opponents

Game log

Player statistics

Season

Player Statistics Citation:

Awards and records
 Marvin Williams, NBA All-Rookie Team 2nd Team

Transactions

References

See also
 2005-06 NBA season

Atlanta Hawks seasons
Atlanta Haw
Atlanta Haw
Atlanta Hawks